The Águas Quentes State Park is a state park in the state of Mato Grosso, Brazil

Location

The Águas Quentes State Park is in the municipality of Santo Antônio do Leverger, Mato Grosso.
The MT-455 highway runs through the park from north to south.
The park is just  from the capital, Cuiabá.
There is a concession for a hotel operating company until 2041.
The hotel has 75 apartments, leisure facilities such as a pool, waterslide, zip lines and restaurant.
There are waterfalls, thermal water pools and hiking trails.

Environment

The Águas Quentes State Park is in the Guimarães plateau in the Paraguay River depression.
The park's vegetation is mainly cerrado, including savanna/seasonal forest, savanna with open trees, riverine forest and seasonal submontane forest.
As of 2005 the park was 34% deforested, up from 30% deforested in 2002.
Tree species include the Jacarezinho, Curatella americana, Ceiba speciosa and Genipa americana.
Fauna includes tapir, peccary, ocelot, paca, armadillo, howler monkey and toucan.

History

The Águas Quentes State Park is the first protected area of Mato Grosso.
On 13 August 2010 SEDTUR agreed that SEMA should prepare a management plan for the park.
On 17 October 2014 SEMA called on owners or leaseholders of land in the park to provide documentation of their claim.
Ownership of the land has been regularised, with all former landowners indemnified.
The consultative council was created on 15 December 2014.
The management plan was approved on 15 March 2015.

Notes

Sources

State parks of Brazil
Protected areas of Mato Grosso